The Unfaithful Eckehart is a 1940 German comedy film directed by Hubert Marischka and starring Hans Moser, Hedwig Bleibtreu and Lucie Englisch. It is based on Hans Stürm's play of the same title, which had previously been made into a 1928 film and a 1931 film.

The film's sets were designed by the art directors Gabriel Pellon and Heinrich Richter.

Cast
Hans Moser as Arthur Fellner
Hedwig Bleibtreu as Valerie, his wife
Lucie Englisch as Traute
Ethel Reschke as Agathe
Theo Lingen as Eckehart, Schwiegerson
Rudi Godden as Fritz Flotter
Else Elster as Susi Moor
Victor Janson as Cnortez
Lotte Spira
Hans Stiebner
Walter Bechmann
Egon Brosig
Franz Fiedler
Irmgard Hoesch
Wolfgang Klein
Ruth Lommel
Josef Reithofer
Walter Schramm-Duncker
Hanns Waschatko
Ewald Wenck
Hilde Wittke
Kurt Zehe
Norman Revels

References

External links

Films of Nazi Germany
German comedy films
1940 comedy films
Films directed by Hubert Marischka
German black-and-white films
Remakes of German films
German films based on plays
Films scored by Ludwig Schmidseder
1940s German-language films
1940s German films